Bae Seong-woo (born November 21, 1972) is a South Korean actor. He starred in film such as Confession of Murder (2012), My Love, My Bride (2014), Office (2015), The Exclusive: Beat the Devil's Tattoo (2015) and Inside Men (2015).

Filmography

Film

Television series

Web series

Awards and nominations

References

External links
 
 
 

1972 births
Living people
South Korean male television actors
South Korean male film actors
South Korean male stage actors
South Korean male musical theatre actors
Place of birth missing (living people)